Temizhbekskaya is a rural locality (a stanitsa) in Kavkazsky District of Krasnodar Krai, Russia, located on the Kuban River. It is named after the village of the Circassian Prince Temizh - Bek, whose tract was located on the opposite side of the Kuban. Population: 5598 (2020),

References

Rural localities in Krasnodar Krai